The Animals in War & Peace Medal of Bravery was instituted in 2019 in the United States by Robin Hutton and Mari Lou Livingood to honor the work of American animals in war and peace. The medal was created to be the American equivalent of the Dickin Medal, awarded in the UK for any animal displaying conspicuous gallantry and devotion to duty particularly in the armed forces or civil emergency services.

Recipients
The first recipients received their awards on November 14, 2019 either posthumously or in person at a ceremony attended by dignitaries and members of Congress on Capitol Hill in Washington, D.C. The event was sponsored by Angels Without Wings, Inc., The Livingood Group, and the National Marine Corps League. Organizers, members of Congress and animal handlers present called it a historic day and that the awards were long overdue.

The recipients included two pigeons, five dogs, and a horse. G.I. Joe, one of the pigeons, died almost 60 years ago, but during World War II, he saved the lives of over one hundred Allied forces by flying 20 miles in 20 minutes to "deliver a message that aborted an imminent bombing by friendly forces." The horse, Sergeant Reckless, served with the U.S. Marines in numerous combat actions during the Korean War, carrying supplies and ammunition, and was also used to evacuate wounded. “Let the record show: Sergeant Reckless was a lot more courageous than I,” said former senator John Warner in presenting the award in honor of the revered horse.

Other posthumous medals were awarded to Chips, a pet husky mix who served in World War II; Stormy, a German Shepherd who helped capture enemy soldiers during the Vietnam war; and Lucca, an IED-detecting dog who protected thousands of human lives as part of her assignments in Iraq and Afghanistan. On her last mission in 2012, when she was on patrol in Afghanistan, she sniffed out a 30-pound (13.6-kilogram) IED and was continuing her search when she lost one of her legs when another IED detonated underneath her. Cpl. Juan Rodriguez, her handler, thought she had been killed, but was able to rescue her.

Two living animals were at the ceremony for their awards: Bucca, a former stray who overcame a rough past to become a star arson-detecting K-9 for the New York Fire Department, and Bass, a Belgian Malinois who held the rare position of “multipurpose canine” in the Marine Corps’ Special Operations Command until retiring in October 2019. Bass was accompanied by his handler, Staff Sgt. Alex Schnell. Bass served four deployments with in Afghanistan, Iraq and Somalia from 2014 to 2019.

At the 2019 ceremony, a campaign was initiated to create an International Animals in War and Peace Museum that will recognize animal heroism in war and peace.

At the second medal ceremony on March 9, 2022, six dogs received either the Medal of Bravery or the new Distinguished Service Medal. One of the dogs had served in World War II, one in the Vietnam War, and one was on the raid that eliminated Osama Bin Laden; the other three were all recently active, and attended the ceremony.  Three of the dogs received the Medal of Bravery.

Distinguished Service Medal 

A second medal, the Animals in War & Peace Distinguished Service Medal, was introduced at the 2022 ceremony, for animals who have distinguished themselves by "exceptionally meritorious service to the U.S in a duty of great responsibility", and was awarded to three dogs.

See also 
 Dogs in warfare
 Horses in warfare

References

Military animals
Awards established in 2019
Awards to animals
Lists of animals
2019 establishments in the United States